Herbert Crichlow (born 26 November 1968) is a four-time ASCAP-awarded British music producer and songwriter living in Sweden. Born in England and raised in Barbados, he is best known for his multiple diamond, platinum and gold awarded works. He is also known for his written collaborations with Max Martin, RedOne, Grammy award winner David Franks and Denniz Pop. In 1997, he was awarded the UN Non Violence project Special Award for outstanding works. Crichlow has crafted hits for pop artists such as Backstreet Boys, Zayn Malik, Robyn, Leila K, Rita Ora, Five,  amongst many others. His songs have been Grammy Award nominated five times.

Discography

Songwriter/producer

Awards
Most played song of the year 1997 ASCAP Award winner
Most played song of the year 1998 ASCAP Award winner
Most played song of the year 1999 ASCAP Award winner
Most played song of the year 2001 ASCAP Award winner

References 

 1326 Songs AB (Publisher) (2022) 
 Universal Music Group (Sub Publisher) (2022)

External links
  (Backstreet Boys)
 
 

Living people
British expatriates in Sweden
1968 births
Barbadian male singers
British people of Barbadian descent
British male songwriters